Hahneberg may refer to:

 Hahneberg (Neusalza-Spremberg), a mountain of Saxony, Germany
 Hahneberg (Reinhardswald), a hill in Hesse, Germany